The Royal Family Order of Harald V of Norway  is a Royal Family Order bestowed by the King of Norway upon female members of the Norwegian royal family. Unlike the other two Royal family orders, it is currently awarded.

Appearance
The insignia of the order consists of a portrait of King Harald V in a jeweled frame, suspended from a red ribbon, with a white border, fimbriated blue.

List of recipients

Queen Sonja of Norway
Mette-Marit, Crown Princess of Norway
Princess Märtha Louise of Norway
Princess Astrid, Mrs. Ferner
Princess Ragnhild, Mrs. Lorentzen
Princess Ingrid Alexandra of Norway
Ingegjerd Løvenskiold Stuart

References

Bibliography
Tom Bergroth: «Royal Portrait Badges», i Guy Stair Sainty og Rafal Heydel-Mankoo: World Orders of Knighthood and Merit, første bind, Buckingham: Burke's Peerage, 2006, s. 829.
Dag T. Hoelseth: «The Norwegian Royal House Orders», i Guy Stair Sainty og Rafal Heydel-Mankoo: World Orders of Knighthood and Merit, første bind, Buckingham: Burke's Peerage, 2006, s. 815.
Lars Stevnsborg: Kongeriget Danmarks ordener, medaljer og hederstegn. Kongeriget Islands ordener og medaljer, Syddansk Universitetsforlag, 2005, s. 199–212

Orders, decorations, and medals of Norway
Norwegian monarchy